Roman Pavlovich Yemelyanov (born 8 May 1992) is a Russian professional football player who plays as a defensive midfielder for Shinnik Yaroslavl on loan from Ural Yekaterinburg.

Career

Konoplyov football academy
Yemelyanov started football education in Konoplyov football academy. At the age of 16 Yemelyanov started to play for FC Togliatti.

Shakhtar Donetsk
On 24 January 2010, he signed a 3-year contract with Ukrainian side Shakhtar Donetsk. In August of the same year, he was loaned to FC Zorya Luhansk.

Shinnik Yaroslavl
On 8 September 2022, Yemelyanov was loaned to Shinnik Yaroslavl.

International
He was called up to the senior Russia squad in August 2016 for matches against Turkey and Ghana.

Career statistics

Club

References

External links
 
 

1992 births
People from Pavlovo, Nizhny Novgorod Oblast
Sportspeople from Nizhny Novgorod Oblast
Living people
Russian footballers
Russia youth international footballers
Russia under-21 international footballers
Association football midfielders
FC Tolyatti players
FC Zorya Luhansk players
FC Shakhtar Donetsk players
FC Rostov players
FC Mariupol players
FC Ural Yekaterinburg players
FC Shinnik Yaroslavl players
Russian Second League players
Ukrainian Premier League players
Russian Premier League players
Russian First League players
Russian expatriate footballers
Expatriate footballers in Ukraine
Russian expatriate sportspeople in Ukraine